Alexandra Meissnitzer (born 18 June 1973) is a retired World Cup alpine ski racer from Austria. Her specialities were the downhill, super-G, and giant slalom disciplines.

From Abtenau, Salzburg, her father, Hans Meissnitzer, a mechanic by trade, taught her to ski at an early age.

At the 1998 Winter Olympics at Nagano, Meissnitzer won the silver in the giant-slalom and the bronze in the super-G, and at the 2006 Winter Olympics at Turin she won the bronze in the super-G. In 1999, she won the overall World Cup, to which she added the super-G and giant slalom World Cups for the same season. She also won two world titles (super-G and giant slalom) at the 1999 World Championships. A serious training crash in November 1999, she missed the remainder of the season. At the 2003 World Championships, she won the silver medal in the downhill race (in a tie with Corinne Rey-Bellet) behind Melanie Turgeon.

Meissnitzer was third in the super-G at the 2008 World Cup finals in Bormio, Italy,  and became the oldest woman (age 34) to finish on the podium in an alpine World Cup race.

World Cup results

Season titles

Season standings

Race victories
 14 wins – (2 DH, 7 SG, 5 GS)
 44 podiums – (8 DH, 18 SG, 16 GS, 2 PS)

World Championship results

Olympic results

References

External links
 
 
 Alexandra Meissnitzer's official web site

1973 births
Austrian female alpine skiers
Alpine skiers at the 1994 Winter Olympics
Alpine skiers at the 1998 Winter Olympics
Alpine skiers at the 2002 Winter Olympics
Alpine skiers at the 2006 Winter Olympics
Olympic alpine skiers of Austria
Medalists at the 1998 Winter Olympics
Medalists at the 2006 Winter Olympics
Olympic medalists in alpine skiing
Olympic silver medalists for Austria
Olympic bronze medalists for Austria
FIS Alpine Ski World Cup champions
People from Hallein District
Living people
Sportspeople from Salzburg (state)
20th-century Austrian women
21st-century Austrian women